Iolaus pamae is a butterfly in the family Lycaenidae. It is found in north-eastern Zambia and western Tanzania.

The larvae feed on Phragmanthera usuiensis usuiensis, Phragmanthera eminii and Phragmanthera proteicola.

References

Butterflies described in 1994
Iolaus (butterfly)